Damadian is a surname. Notable people with the surname include: 

 Mihran Damadian (1863–1945), Armenian freedom fighter, political activist, writer, and teacher
 Raymond Damadian (1936–2022), American physician and medical practitioner

Armenian-language surnames